Brody Neuenschwander (born 1958) is a calligrapher and artist who lives in Bruges, Belgium.

Education 
Neuenschwander was educated at Princeton University where he received his B.A. in Art History in 1981. While a student at Princeton, he was appointed a University Scholar. He went on to complete a doctorate in 1986 at the Courtauld Institute of Art in London. His PhD thesis was on the methodology of German art historical practices. He graduated with distinction from the Roehampton Institute of Calligraphy in 1985.

Biography 
Neuenschwander was born in Houston, Texas, and currently lives and works in Bruges, Belgium. Following graduate school, he entered his professional career working as an assistant to the English calligrapher Donald Jackson.

He has collaborated with the filmmaker Peter Greenaway on numerous films, operas and television projects. He worked together with Greenaway on Prospero's Books, The Pillow Book, Writing to Vermeer and others.

Neuenschwander taught at the Museum of Fine Arts, Boston in 2004. During this time he developed research into the origins of text-based visual art. He has translated many writings of Hans-Joachim Burgert, a German theoretician and calligrapher. His work has been included in the International Exhibition of Calligraphy. Burgert's theories about world calligraphy influenced Neuenschwander's interest in Arabic and Chinese calligraphy. His work is the subject of a monograph, Textasy: The Work of Brody Neuenschwander. Neuenschwander has also created calligraphic installations.

Exhibitions 
Neuenschwander has shown his work at the  Museum Correr Fondazione Musei Civici di Venezia, the Contemporary Museum of Calligraphy in Moscow, among other venues.

Collections 
Neuenschwander's work is in the permanent collection of the Berlin Calligraphy Collection of the Akademie der Kunste.

References 

1958 births
20th-century calligraphers 
21st-century calligraphers 
American calligraphers
American expatriates
Belgian calligraphers
Living people